Artem Harutyunyan (born 13 August 1990) is an Armenian-born German professional boxer. As an amateur, Harutyunyan represented Germany at the 2016 Olympics, winning a bronze medal in the light-welterweight bracket.

Professional boxing record

References

External links
 
 
 
 

1990 births
Living people
Sportspeople from Yerevan
Armenian emigrants to Germany
German male boxers
Olympic boxers of Germany
Boxers at the 2016 Summer Olympics
Olympic bronze medalists for Germany
Olympic medalists in boxing
Medalists at the 2016 Summer Olympics
Light-welterweight boxers